Ademir Candido de Sousa Neto (born 30 January 1995) is a Brazilian footballer who plays as a striker, most recently for Brazilian side Ituano FC.

Career

Club
On 31 August 2015, Candido joined Finnish Veikkausliiga club HJK on loan for the remainder of the 2015 season.

References

External links

1995 births
Living people
Brazilian footballers
Associação Atlética Ponte Preta players
Clube Atlético Penapolense players
Association football forwards
People from Diadema